Izz al-Din Yacoub is a retired Egyptian Long Jumper.

Achievements

See also
Egyptian athletes

References

Living people
Egyptian male long jumpers
Year of birth missing (living people)
African Games silver medalists for Egypt
African Games medalists in athletics (track and field)
Athletes (track and field) at the 1965 All-Africa Games
20th-century Egyptian people